Singh v Canada (Minister of Employment and Immigration), [1985] 1 S.C.R. 177 is a 1985 case of the Supreme Court of Canada.

Between 1977 and 1980, Harbhajan Singh, six Sikh foreign nationals and one from Guyana attempted to claim convention refugee status under the Immigration Act, 1976 on the basis that they had a well-founded fear of persecution in their home country. They were denied status by the Minister of Employment and Immigration on the advice of the Refugee Status Advisory Committee. 

The six foreign nationals challenged the adjudication procedures under the Immigration Act on the basis that it violated section 7 of the Canadian Charter of Rights and Freedoms and violated section 2(e) of the Canadian Bill of Rights. The federal government claimed that since they had no status within the country they were not subject to the Charter.

Opinion of the Court
All six Justices (Ritchie J. not taking part in the judgment) agreed to allow the appeal. The Court found that the seven foreign nationals were protected by the Charter and their rights had been violated. Justice Bertha Wilson (writing on behalf of Dickson C.J. and Lamer) wrote the decision based on section 7 rights to security of person and fundamental justice. She also found the government's claim that giving hearing to refugees would be burdensome was too utilitarian a concern, and that  administrative convenience would rarely be sufficiently compelling to justify infringing a Charter right.

The other Justices (Beetz, Estey and McIntyre), concurring with Wilson J. found in favour of the rights claimants but through section 2(e) of the Bill of Rights. Justice Jean Beetz, writing for this half of the Court, noted that section 26 of the Charter states that rights outside the Charter are not invalid, and hence the Bill of Rights still has a role to play in Canadian law. Beetz went on to find that in this case, refugees had been denied hearings. Thus, their section 2(e) rights to fair hearings and fundamental justice were infringed.

Notes

See also
 List of Supreme Court of Canada cases

External links
 

Canadian immigration and refugee case law
Section Seven Charter case law
Supreme Court of Canada cases
1985 in Canadian case law
1985 in international relations